Andrew Newell may refer to:
Andrew Newell (skier) (born 1984), Olympic skier
Andrew Newell (athlete), Paralympic competitor from Australia
Andrew Newell (cricketer), Australian cricketer